mRNA-decapping enzyme 1B is a protein that in humans is encoded by the DCP1B gene.

DCP1B is a core component of the mRNA decapping complex, a key factor in the regulation of mRNA decay (Lykke-Andersen, 2002).[supplied by OMIM]

References

Further reading